Palayamkottai block is a revenue block in the Tirunelveli district of Tamil Nadu, India. It has a total of 30 panchayat.

Panchayats in Palayamkottai Panchayat Union

 Ariyakulam
 Itteri
 Keelanatham
 Kansapuram
 Konganthanparai
 Keelapattam
 Kunnathoor
 Melaputhaneri
 Maruthur
 Manappadaiveedu
 Muthur
 Melathidiyoor
 Munnirpallam
 Melapattam
 Naduvakurichi
 Ponnakudy
 Palayamchettikulam
 Pudukulam
 Rajavallipuram
 Ramayanpatti
 Rediyarpatti
 Seevalaperi
 Sivanthipatti
 Nochikulam
 Sengulam
 Tharuvai
 Thiruvenkatanatha puram
 Thidiyoor
 Thirumalaikolundu puram
 Udaiyarkulam

References 

 

Revenue blocks of Tirunelveli district